Tatiana Belonogoff (born 16 July 2001) is a Russian swimmer. She competed in the women's 100 metre breaststroke event at the 2020 European Aquatics Championships, in Budapest, Hungary.

References

2001 births
Living people
Russian female swimmers
Russian female breaststroke swimmers
Place of birth missing (living people)